"Your Dog" is a song recorded by American singer-songwriter Soccer Mommy. The song was released on January 9, 2018 through Fat Possum Records, as the lead single from her debut studio album Clean.

Background
Allison wrote the song at the conclusion of a relationship. She considered herself in a "pathetic" place when writing the song, hopeful to be stronger but finding it difficult to do so. In a press release accompanying the song's premiere, Allison had this to say regarding its meaning:

The song's music video, directed by Weird Life, has been described by Mike Katzif of NPR as a "bleakly humorous horror flick illustrating the sudden, heartbreaking ending of a relationship which had long since soured."

Critical reception
NPR's Katzif extolled the tune as an "anthem suited for these times. It's a song reclaiming agency and identity taken by another other person's condescension, control and abuse." Olivia Horn at Pitchfork too labeled it an "emboldened anthem," complimenting its "charming, twisted guitar riffs" and "breathy multi-tracked vocals." Dave Simpson at The Guardian praised its "vivid, startling lyrics."

References

2018 singles
2018 songs
Soccer Mommy songs